Bauhinia haughtii is a species of plant in the family Fabaceae. It is found only in Ecuador. Its natural habitats are subtropical or tropical moist lowland forests and subtropical or tropical moist montane forests.

References

haughtii
Endemic flora of Ecuador
Endangered flora of South America
Taxonomy articles created by Polbot